Anne Marie Almedal (born 6 December 1971 in Kristiansand, Norway) is a Norwegian musician. She was lead vocalist in the band Velvet Belly (1989–2003) and has since released five solo albums.

Career 
Almedal is a graduate of the Rhythmic music program at the Rotterdam Conservatory of Music. She studied Dutch language and culture at the University of Leiden and a foundation in Christianity studies at the University of Oslo. She currently works as managing director at AKKS Kristiansand, an idealistic music organisation working for equality and gender balance in the Norwegian music industry.

She is known to many as the composer and singer of the theme song for the TV series Himmelblå broadcast by NRK. In 2000, she married the musician and composer Nicholas Sillitoe and they currently live in Vågsbygd, Kristiansand together with their two children, Florian and Stella Marie.

Discography

Solo albums 

2007: The Siren and the Sage (+47/Warner Music)
2010: Blue Sky Blue (+47/VME)
2012: Memory Lane (+47/VME)
2018: Lightshadow (+47/VME)
2022: We Dance Alone (+47/VME)

Collaborations 
Within Velvet Belly
1992: Colours (released again with new cover by BMG in 1995)
1993: Little Lies
1994: Window Tree
1995: Window Tree (BMG, new release with new record-company)
1996: The Landing (BMG)
1997: Lucia (BMG) (European and Japanese releases, with different covers; Japanese release includes The Man With the Child in His Eyes, a cover of the Kate Bush song)
2003: Velvet Belly (Playground) double-album

With Lars Saabye Christensen, Ole Henrik Giørtz, Anne Marie Giørtz, Kristin Kajander & Elin Rosseland
1999: Skrapjern Og Silke (Grappa Music)

With Jan Bang, Erik Honoré & Nils Chr. Moe-Repstad
2002: Going Nine Ways From Wednesday (Pan M Records)

With Green Carnation
2007: A Night Under the Dam – live DVD (Sublife Records)

Film music 
Himmelblå, for TV series Himmelblå at NRK.

Dirk Ohm

References

External links 
Livet med og uten «Himmelblå» Anmeldelse av Blue Sky Blue
Anne Marie Almedal – memory lane on Wordpress.com
Ingrid Michalsen: Portrettet: Anne Marie Almedal. Article in Fædrelandsvennen God helg 22. 22 May 2010, pp. 20–23.

1971 births
Living people
Norwegian pop musicians
English-language singers from Norway
Musicians from Kristiansand
21st-century Norwegian singers
21st-century Norwegian women singers